Alla Mazur is a Ukrainian journalist and news presenter for the Ukrainian television programs TSN and TSN Week on the 1+1.

References

Ukrainian television journalists
Date of birth missing (living people)
Place of birth missing (living people)
Living people
1+1 (TV channel) people
Year of birth missing (living people)